The Citadel Bulldogs basketball teams represented The Citadel, The Military College of South Carolina in Charleston, South Carolina, United States.  The program was established in 1900–01, and has continuously fielded a team since 1912–13.  Their primary rivals are College of Charleston, Furman and VMI.

1900–01

1912–13

1913–14

1914–15

1915–16

1916–17

1917–18

The 1917–18 season was interrupted by World War I and the Spanish flu.

1918–19

References

 

The Citadel Bulldogs basketball seasons